The Sumgayit 2012–13 season is Sumgayit's second Azerbaijan Premier League season, and second season under Bernhard Raab. Sumgayit also competed in the 2012–13 Azerbaijan Cup, getting knocked out by Baku at the Second round stage.

Squad

Transfers

Summer

In:

Out:

Winter

In:

Out:

Competitions

Azerbaijan Premier League

Results summary

Results

League table

Azerbaijan Premier League Relegation Group

Results summary

Results by round

Results

Table

Azerbaijan Cup

Squad statistics

Appearances and goals

|-
|colspan="14"|Players who left Sumgayit during the season:

|}

Goal scorers

Disciplinary record

References

External links 
Soccerway

Sumgayit
Sumgayit FK seasons